Charles Armand René de La Trémoille (14 January 1708, in Paris – 23 May 1741), 6th duc de Thouars, was the son of Charles Louis Bretagne de La Trémoille and his wife, Marie Madeleine Motier de la Fayette.

La Trémoille was a French soldier and president of the States of Brittany.  He joined the military at a young age and became a colonel of the Champagne regiment at the age of eighteen.  Later, he became governor of Île-de-France.  He distinguished himself in the battle of Guastalla, in Italy, and was named shortly thereafter sergeant of the armies of the king.  La Trémoille was the author of some works and was elected a member of the Académie française on 13 February 1738.

On 29 January 1725 he married his cousin Marie Hortense de La Tour d'Auvergne, the daughter of Marie Armande Victoire de la Trémoïlle (1677–1717) and Emmanuel-Théodose de La Tour d'Auvergne, duc de Bouillon (1668–1730).

Marie Hortense, like her husband was a granddaughter of Charles Belgique Hollande de La Trémoille.  From this union was born a son: Jean Bretagne Charles de La Trémoille and a daughter who died in infancy.

Issue
Jean Bretagne Charles de La Trémoille (4 February 1737 – 15 May 1792) married Marie Geneviève de Durfort, no issue. Married Princess Marie Maximilienne Louise of Salm-Kyrburg and had issue. 
X de La Trémoille (5 Mar 1740 – March 1744) female who died in infancy.

1708 births
1741 deaths
Nobility from Paris
Members of the Académie Française
Charles Armand Rene
Dukes of Thouars
18th-century French writers
18th-century French male writers
People of Byzantine descent
18th-century peers of France
Military personnel from Paris